Compensation & Benefits Review is a bimonthly peer-reviewed academic journal that covers in the field of labor relations. The editor-in-chief is Phillip Bryant (Columbus State University). It was established in 1969 and is currently published by SAGE Publications.

Abstracting and Indexing 
Compensation & Benefits Review is abstracted and indexed in:
 Business Source Elite
 Business Source Premier
 NISC
 Sociological Abstracts
 TOPICsearch

External links 
 

SAGE Publishing academic journals
English-language journals
Labour journals
Publications established in 1969
Bimonthly journals